Surfact were a Danish rock band formed in 2003.

They first got noticed in 2006 when they won the Starfighters competition, and subsequently released their debut album Terrific Downfall.  Although they didn't break through commercially until 2009 when they released their second album Euphoria, which spawned the hit singles "Absolutely Shameless" and "All Night Overload".

The band toured both Europe and the United States, but are mostly known in Scandinavia. On May 12, 2014, the band announced on their Facebook page that they had played their last show and would not be continuing as a band.

Discography

Albums
2006: Terrific Downfall
2009: Euphoria
2011: Feeding the Beast

External links
 Surfact at MySpace
 Surfact on Facebook

Danish musical groups